Nizhnezolotilovo is a rural locality (a village) in Shenkursky District, Arkhangelsk Oblast, Russia. The population was 9 as of 2012.

Geography 
Nizhnezolotilovo is located on the Vaga River, 31 km north of Shenkursk (the district's administrative centre) by road. Nikiforovskaya is the nearest rural locality.

References 

Rural localities in Shenkursky District